Dowshalvari (also Romanized as Dowshalvārī) is a village in Holayjan Rural District, in the Central District of Izeh County, Khuzestan Province, Iran. At the 2006 census, its population was 14, in 4 families.

References 

Populated places in Izeh County